Solovyovsk is a rural locality (a selo) and the administrative center of Solovyovsky Selsoviet of Tyndinsky District, Amur Oblast, Russia. The population was 2,731 as of 2018. There are 43 streets.

Geography 
Solovyovsk is located 128 km south of Tynda (the district's administrative centre) by road. Never is the nearest rural locality.

References 

Rural localities in Tyndinsky District